Megachile vigilans is a species of bee in the family Megachilidae. It was described by Frederick Smith, a British entomologist, in 1878.

References

Vigilans
Insects described in 1878